Kogula Airfield was an airfield in Saare County, Estonia.

The airfield was built before 1941. During WWII the airfield was used by the Soviet Naval Air Force to bomb Berlin.

References

External links
 Kogula Airfield at Forgotten Airfields

Defunct airports in Estonia
Buildings and structures in Saare County
Soviet Air Force bases